The Big Wood River is a  river in central Idaho, United States, that is a tributary of the Malad River (which in turn is tributary to the Snake River and Columbia River).

Course
From its source in the Sawtooth Range near Galena Summit in the Sawtooth National Recreation Area, the Big Wood River generally flows south between the Boulder Mountains to the north, Pioneer Mountains to the east, and the Smoky Mountains to the west.  Highway 75 accompanies the river southward from Galena Summit, to an area north of Shoshone. Here, it carved Black Magic Canyon.

The river flows by Sun Valley and Ketchum, where it receives the tributary streams of Warm Springs Creek and Trail Creek. Below Ketchum, it is joined by the East Fork Wood River at Gimlet before passing by the small cities of Hailey and Bellevue. Continuing south, the river enters the Wood River Valley, the northern part of Magic Valley, after which it flows into Magic Reservoir. A tributary stream, Camas Creek, joins the river in Magic Reservoir.

Below Magic Dam, the Big Wood River enters Lincoln County, passing by many lava beds and irrigation canals before entering Gooding County. Just west of Gooding, the Big Wood River joins the Little Wood River to form the Malad River.

Big Wood River's water flow is affected by numerous irrigation reservoirs and canals on the river itself and its tributaries.

Variant names of the Big Wood River, according to the USGS, include Malad River, Malade River, Wood River, Poisonous Beaver River, and Sickley River.

See also

 List of Idaho rivers
 List of longest streams of Idaho

Notes

References

External links

Rivers of Idaho
Rivers of Blaine County, Idaho
Rivers of Lincoln County, Idaho
Rivers of Gooding County, Idaho
Tributaries of the Snake River
Sawtooth National Forest
Bellevue, Idaho